Ron Lang (born 5 February 1937) is an American former volleyball player who competed in the 1964 Summer Olympics.

References

1937 births
Living people
American men's volleyball players
Olympic volleyball players of the United States
Volleyball players at the 1964 Summer Olympics
USC Trojans men's volleyball players